Tebenna micalis, also known as the small thistle moth, is a species of moth in the family Choreutidae found worldwide. It was first described by the German Bohemian entomologist, Joseph Johann Mann in 1857.

Description
It is similar in appearance to the Nearctic Tebenna gnaphaliella and can be found between June and August. It comes to light and can be found during the day on the flowers of the larval foodplant.

The larvae feed on Asteraceae within a blotch, sometimes leaving the mine and starting another. Later instars can live freely in a web on the leaf. Larval foodplants recorded include, on common fleabane (Pulicaria dysenterica) in the United Kingdom. In Australia on capeweed (Arctotheca calendula), spear thistle (Cirsium vulgare), horseweed (Erigeron canadensis), cotton thistle (Onopordum acanthium) and golden everlasting (Xerochrysum bracteatum); and in Réunion on globe artichoke (Cynara scolymus). They mine the leaves of their host plant in a sizable blotch with an ample quantity of frass. The larva may leave its mine and restart elsewhere. Older larvae often live free in a web on the leaf.

Larvae pupate on the underside of a leaf of the host plant, in a spindle-shaped cocoon.

Distribution
In Europe it is found south of the line Ireland, Great Britain, France and Slovakia. In Britain it is an immigrant that occurs irregularly, since it was first discovered in the 1980s. Outside of Europe, it has been recorded from China (Henan, Hubei, Jiangxi, Tibet, Zhejiang), Nepal, Russia, Japan (Honshu, Ryukyu Islands), Afghanistan, Tajikistan, Uzbekistan, Turkmenistan, Canary Islands, North Africa, Arabia, Asia Minor, Zakavkazye, Iran, Lebanon, New Zealand, and the Oriental, Ethiopian, Australian and Nearctic regions.

Subspecies
Tebenna micalis micalis
Tebenna micalis dialecta Diakonoff, 1985 (Madagascar, Mauritius, Namibia and South Africa)

References

Tebenna
Leaf miners
Lepidoptera of Réunion
Moths described in 1857
Moths of Africa
Moths of Asia
Moths of Europe
Moths of Madagascar
Moths of Mauritius
Moths of New Zealand
Taxa named by Josef Johann Mann